One Dimple is a CD/DVD released by comedian Kyle Cease in 2006. The CD contained a recorded performance of one of Kyle's acts in the Seattle, Washington comedy club, The Comedy Underground.
The CD contains 13 tracks, all but one being part of the stand-up routine. The last was a comedy sketch.
The DVD contains a 52-minute-long documentary of Kyle's road tour of 68 colleges. It also includes a performance by Kyle on the Comedy Central television show Premium Blend.
The documentary follows Kyle through his "68 College Tour" slightly as an 80's Nintendo game, a gag on Kyle's joke about Nintendo.

Track listing
14 Hour Show
And That's Gonna Be Track 1
Me Telling You That Tracks 2 And 1 Are The 14 Hour Show
Four Hacky Travel Jokes
Generation Nintendo
Pills Drunk Daddy
My Weird Jokes
Elementary President
The Virgin Mary, The Alien, And My Grandma
Cheating, Dreaming Old People Who Won't Shut Up
Asian Bell
SCHMcDonalds
Bonus Sketch

The DVD
The DVD of the Road Documentary is 52 minutes long, and displays the journey Kyle takes through visiting 68 colleges. The DVD allows the viewer to listen to commentary by Kyle and his brother Kevin, who made all the music for the movie. As a joke, it also contains commentary by a trombone, an electric toothbrush, and a vacuum cleaner.

External links
 The Comedy Underground's Site
 Live Performance Review

2006 live albums
Comedy Central Records live albums
Stand-up comedy albums
2000s comedy albums
Live comedy albums
Spoken word albums by American artists
Live spoken word albums